The Australian Top 100 Singles Chart is a chart that ranks the best-performing singles of Australia. Published by the ARIA report, the data are compiled by the Australian Recording Industry Association (ARIA) based collectively on each single's weekly physical and digital sales and airplay. In 2001, there were 14 singles that topped the chart.

In 2001, 16 acts achieved their first number-one single in Australia, either as a lead artist or featured guest, including Shaggy, Mýa, LeAnn Rimes, Lifehouse, Scandal'us, and Alien Ant Farm. Shaggy, Rayvon, Scandal'us, and Kylie Minogue were the only acts to have earned a number-one debut single this year. Reggae singer Shaggy and R&B singer Mýa had two number-one singles that reached the top-spot. During the year, five collaboration singles reached the number-one position.

Shaggy's "Angel" and Alien Ant Farm's "Smooth Criminal" were the longest-running number-one singles of 2001, remaining in that position for eight weeks. The second-longest run at number-one was "Can't Fight the Moonlight" by Leann Rimes, whose streak on the top spot reached six weeks. Another single with an extended chart run was Lifehouse's "Hanging by a Moment", which topped the chart for five weeks.

Chart history

Number-one artists

Songs that peaked at number two include I'm Like A Bird by Nelly Furtado, Whole Again by Atomic Kitten, Don't Stop Movin' by S Club 7, Ms. Jackson by Outkast, How You Remind Me by Nickelback, Let's Get Married by Jagged Edge and Strawberry Kisses by Nikki Webster

Songs that peaked at number three include All Rise by Blue, Dance With Me by Debelah Morgan, Bette Davis Eyes by Gwyneth Paltrow, Purple Pills by D12 and I'm Real by Jennifer Lopez

Other hit songs included Butterfly by Crazy Town (4), With Arms Wide Open by Creed (4), Let Me Blow Ya Mind by Eve feat. Gwen Stefani (4), Operation Blade by Public Domain (7)

See also
2001 in music
List of top 25 singles for 2001 in Australia
List of number-one dance singles of 2001 (Australia)

Notes
Number of number-one singles: 15
Longest run at number one: Angel by Shaggy and Smooth Criminal by Alien Ant Farm (8 weeks)

References
Australian Record Industry Association (ARIA) official site
OzNet Music Chart

Specific

2001 in Australian music
2001 record charts
2001